The Drugs (Prevention of Misuse) Act 1964 is an Act of Parliament in the United Kingdom. The importation of lysergamide and its derivatives was restricted by this Act.

This Act added synthetic amphetamine type drugs to restriction similar to previously restricted drugs such as opium, morphine and cocaine.

The Act was repealed by the Misuse of Drugs Act 1971.

References

External links
Image of the Act on the UK Parliament website

United Kingdom Acts of Parliament 1964
Drug control law in the United Kingdom